Yeh Zindagi Kitni Haseen Hai is a 1966 Hindi-language romantic drama film directed by R. K. Nayyar. The film was produced by Nayyar fr his R. K. Nayyar Films banner. It had story and screenplay by Harish Kumar Mehra with dialogues by Agha Jani Kashmiri. The music was composed by Ravi with lyrics written by Rajendra Krishan.

The film starred Joy Mukherjee, who was cast in films where the hero was required to perform the Shammi Kapoor style of acting. Though he did not achieve Kapoor's fame and popularity, he acted in several films with good music and popular songs recorded in Mohammed Rafi's voice. Yeh Zindagi Kitni Haseen Hai is cited as one of his "major" films. Saira Banu played the lead female role, where she is shown upholding "Indian morals" by refusing to wear a swimsuit for the Miss Universe contest. Besides this film, Saira had acted in two other film in 1966, Saaz Aur Awaaz and Pyar Mohabbat. The films "failed to make an impact" for Saira as an actress that year. Co-stars included Motilal, Sayeeda Khan, Badri Prasad and Madan Kumar.

Plot
Sarita, a princess is troubled by her bodyguards and tries to evade them. Not successful, she plans to run away. During one of her adventures during her flight from home, she joins a beauty contest for Miss Universe. The winner of the local contest will be sent to Paris representing India in the Miss Universe pageant. There she meets Sanjay Malhotra who is a participant in the Mr. Handsome contest. The two fall in love and continue dodging the guards sent from home to look for her. The story then has people after her for her money and Sanjay not being what he claims to be. The film ends with misunderstandings and secrets cleared and Sanjay and Sarita reuniting.

Cast 
 Joy Mukherjee as Sanjay Malhotra
 Saira Banu as Princess Sarita / Sarita (Double Role)
 Ashok Kumar as Mr. Gupta
 Motilal as Mr. Jolkar
 Sayeeda Khan as Olga
 Badri Prasad as Dinu
 Madan Kumar as William

Soundtrack
The music was composed by Ravi with lyrics by Rajendra Krishan. The playback singing was provided by Asha Bhosle (4 Songs) and Mohammed Rafi (3 Songs).

Song list

References

External links
 

1966 films
1960s Hindi-language films
Films scored by Ravi